The Sheffield & Hallamshire Women's Challenge Cup is a women's county cup competition involving teams within the Sheffield and Hallamshire County Football Association.

2021-22 Participants

Finals

See also
 Sheffield & Hallamshire Women's County League

References

Football in South Yorkshire